Charles G. Armstrong is an American attorney and former officer of the United States Navy, best known for his 28-year tenure as president of the Seattle Mariners Major League Baseball club, a position from which he stepped down on January 31, 2014.

Early life
Armstrong was born in Louisville, Kentucky. In 1964, he earned an engineering degree from Purdue University, followed by a law degree from Stanford University in 1967. Shortly after graduation, Armstrong began his three-year career in the navy.

Seattle Mariners
Armstrong was employed as general counsel for George Argyros' California real estate business when the latter purchased the Mariners from the team's original ownership group, led by entertainer Danny Kaye, in 1981. Argyros immediately brought Armstrong to Seattle to serve as the team's president.  During 1987 and 1988, Argyros was attempting to purchase the San Diego Padres and sell the Mariners to several possible out-of-state investors, one of whom intended to move the team to Miami.  Armstrong attempted to organize a group of Seattle-based investors with the intention of keeping the team in Seattle; however, citing a conflict of interest, Argyros instructed him to "back away" from his efforts. The Mariners were eventually sold to Indiana businessman Jeff Smulyan in 1989, and Armstrong was let go.

Armstrong worked for several Seattle companies as a consultant from 1989 to 1992, and served as interim athletic director for the University of Washington Huskies, during 1991.  In 1991, after Smulyan had put the team up for sale and rumors persisted that they would relocate to the Tampa Bay area, Armstrong was recruited by then-U.S. Senator Slade Gorton to aid in efforts keep the Mariners in Seattle.  He served as a consultant to Seattle-area business leader John Ellis while The Baseball Club of Seattle (led by Nintendo chairman Hiroshi Yamauchi) was negotiating to purchase the team.  Major League Baseball stipulated that, as a condition of allowing the team's sale to a group with foreign majority investors, "North American interests" were to run the club's day-to-day operations.  The sale was approved in June 1992.  Armstrong was brought back to serve as the team's president in 1993, with Ellis serving as CEO and representing the team's ownership group (a role filled by former Nintendo of America executive Howard Lincoln since Ellis' retirement in 2000).

On November 25, 2013, Armstrong announced that he would retire from his position as President and COO of the Mariners.  January 31, 2014 marked his last day as the Mariners' president.

References

External links

Seattle Mariners Official site

Major League Baseball executives
Major League Baseball team presidents
Living people
United States Navy officers
Seattle Mariners executives
Purdue University College of Engineering alumni
Stanford Law School alumni
Sportspeople from Louisville, Kentucky
Year of birth missing (living people)